The Ring (often called The Ring magazine or Ring magazine) is an American boxing magazine that was first published in 1922 as a boxing and wrestling magazine. As the sporting legitimacy of professional wrestling came more into question, The Ring shifted to becoming exclusively a boxing-oriented publication. The magazine is currently owned by Oscar De La Hoya's Golden Boy Enterprises division of Golden Boy Promotions, which acquired it in 2007. Ring began publishing annual ratings of boxers in 1924.

History
The Ring, founded and published by future International Boxing Hall of Fame member Nat Fleischer, has perpetrated boxing scandals, helped make unknown fighters famous worldwide and covered boxing's biggest events of all time. Dan Daniel was a co-founder and prolific contributor to The Ring through most of its history. It refers to itself (and is referred to by others) as "The Bible of Boxing." During the Fleischer years, the contents page or indicia of every issue carried the claim: "The Ring is a magazine which a man may take home with him. He may leave it on his library table safe in the knowledge that it does not contain one line of matter either in the text or the advertisements which would be offensive. The publisher of The Ring guards this reputation of his magazine jealously. It is entertaining and it is clean."

In 1972, following Fleischer's death, his son-in-law and managing editor Nat Loubet took over as publisher. In 1977, Loubet launched three international editions of the magazine. The Spanish version, Ring En Español, was published in Venezuela and distributed to all Spanish-speaking countries and the United States (U.S.) until 1985. There was also a Japanese version published in Tokyo and a French version published in Paris.

In 1976, managing editor of The Ring Johnny Ort, fabricated records of selected boxers, and elevated their rankings, securing them lucrative fights on the American ABC television network, as part of the United States Championship Tournament orchestrated by promoter Don King. The deception was uncovered by boxing writer Malcolm "Flash" Gordon and ABC staffer Alex Wallau and the United States Championship tournament was cancelled by ABC.

In 1979, the magazine was purchased from Loubet by a group led by Dave DeBusschere and Bert Sugar took over as editor. In 1983 Sugar was succeeded by future New York boxing commissioner Randy Gordon. By 1984 the publication was reported to be over $1 million in debt and a number of top salaried employees, including Gordon, were let go. Nigel Collins of the Ring's defunct sister magazine Boxing Illustrated took over as editor. In 1989 The Ring was purchased by Stanley Weston's G.C. London Publishing (later known as Kappa Publishing Group), which also published KO Magazine and a number of wrestling publications. KO senior writer Steve Farhood became The Ring's editor. Weston was a sentimentalist and 52 years after joining The Ring magazine as a stock boy, Weston purchased the magazine that gave him his first job. He not only resurrected the magazine from its imminent collapse, he re-established the publication as the definitive source for boxing news. An outstanding boxing artist, Weston painted 57 covers for The Ring with his first cover, a painting of Billy Conn, for the December 1939 issue. Weston was also a photographer who, according to his own estimate, shot over 100,000 boxing photosthe majority of which are housed in the archives of The Ring magazine.

Sports and Entertainment Publications, LLC, a subsidiary of Oscar De La Hoya's Golden Boy Enterprises, acquired The Ring, KO Magazine, and World Boxing in 2007. The magazine's rankings are recognized as "official" by some in the U.S. media, particularly ESPN. While some may see a conflict of interest in a boxing promoter being paymaster of what is essentially a magazine/rankings organization that awards world titles and belts, De La Hoya says that is not the case. "These magazines will be held in an editorial trust where they will be operating totally independent of any influence from me or others from the Golden Boy Companies as it relates to editorial direction or content". Also there is a 35-member ratings advisory panel, which include many of the media that cover boxing, who would prevent Golden Boy Promotions from using the magazine for self gain.

The Ring was headquartered in Blue Bell, Pennsylvania until 2011 when it was relocated to Los Angeles.

The magazine had a sister publication named The Ring Wrestling which came about due to professional wrestling writer Bob Leonard contacting the magazine and expressing that it was too focused on boxing and not giving wrestling enough coverage. Nat Loubet served as the editor of the wrestling magazine as well.

Cover art
Some of the boxers featured on the magazine covers have included Tommy Ryan, Salvador Sánchez, Jack Dempsey, Pancho Villa, Max Schmeling, Joe Louis, Sugar Ray Robinson, Jake LaMotta, Rocky Marciano, Willie Pep, Muhammad Ali, Alexis Argüello, Wilfred Benítez, Wilfredo Gómez, Roberto Durán, Larry Holmes, Marvin Hagler, Sugar Ray Leonard, Bud Taylor, Mike Tyson, Evander Holyfield, Floyd Mayweather Jr., Thomas Hearns, Roy Jones Jr., Bernard Hopkins, Julio César Chávez, Félix Trinidad, Manny Pacquiao, Oscar De La Hoya, Mauro Mina and Ricardo Mayorga. In 1978, boxer Cathy "Cat" Davis became the first woman ever to be on a cover of The Ring, and she held the distinction of being the only woman featured on the cover of the magazine until January 2016, when Ronda Rousey joined her and also became the first mixed martial arts fighter featured on its cover. The Ring has used cover artwork created by famed artists such as LeRoy Neiman and Richard T. Slone.

The Ring world champions

The Ring has its own championship belt in a given weight class where The Ring champion holds a lineal reign to the throne, the man who beat the man. The Ring began awarding championship belts in 1922. The first Ring world title belt was awarded to heavyweight champion Jack Dempsey and the second was awarded to flyweight champion Pancho Villa. The Ring stopped giving belts to world champions in the 1990s, then reintroduced their titles in 2002.

The Ring stated that their title was "intended to reward fighters who, by satisfying rigid criteria, can justify a claim as the true and only world champion in a given weight class". It echoed many critics' arguments that the sanctioning bodies in charge of boxing championships had undermined the sport by pitting undeserving contenders against undeserving "champions" and forcing the boxing public to see mismatches for so-called "world championships". The Ring attempts to be more authoritative and open than the sanctioning bodies' rankings, with a page devoted to full explanations for ranking changes. A fighter pays no sanctioning fees to defend or fight for the title at stake, contrary to practices of the sanctioning bodies.

However, many boxing journalists complained that The Ring ignored the world championship lineage when they started awarding titles again. A controversy described by Cliff Rold of BoxingScene.com is for example, the "world" light-heavyweight title was considered vacant from the time Michael Spinks went up to heavyweight in 1985 until 1996. While the Cyber Boxing Zone and the International Boxing Research Organization considers Virgil Hill's defeat of Henry Maske (who were the two highest rated light-heavyweights) as the beginning of the new lineage, The Ring awarded their newly reintroduced title to Roy Jones. In 2002, The Ring editor, Nigel Collins, acknowledged that if their championship policy was in place in 1997, Dariusz Michalczewski, who defeated Hill, "probably would have been The Ring Champion."

Under the original version of the championship policy, there were only two ways that a boxer could win The Rings title: defeat the reigning champion; or win a box-off between the magazine's number-one and number-two rated contenders (or, sometimes, number-one and number-three rated). A vacant Ring championship was filled when the number-one contender in a weight-division battles the number-two contender or the number-three contender (in cases where The Ring determined that the number-two and number-three contenders were close in abilities and records).  The ratings are compiled by the magazine's editorial board, with the participation of The Ring Ratings Panel of boxing journalists from around the world. A fighter could not be stripped of the title unless he lost, decided to move to another weight division, or retired.

In May 2012, citing the number of vacancies in various weight classes as primary motivation, The Ring unveiled a new championship policy. Under the new policy, The Ring title can be awarded when the No. 1 and No. 2 fighters face one another or when the No. 1 and 2 contenders choose not to fight one another and either of them fights No. 3, No. 4 or No. 5, the winner may be awarded The Ring belt. In addition, there are now seven ways for a fighter to lose his title: 
 The champion loses a fight in the weight class in which he is champion.  
 The champion moves to another weight class.  
 The champion does not schedule a fight in any weight class for 18 months.  
 The champion does not schedule a fight at his championship weight for 18 months (even if he fights at another weight).
 The champion does not schedule a fight with a top five contender from any weight class for two years.  
 The champion retires. 
 The champion tests positive for a banned substance.

Many media outlets and members are extremely critical of the new championship policy and state that if this new policy is followed The Ring title will lose the credibility it once held. They then later changed the policy so vacant belts can only be awarded to the winner of  No. 1 vs No. 2 or if No. 3 is deemed worthy by The Ring’s Editorial Board.

The purchase of The Ring magazine by Golden Boy Promotions in 2007, the dismissal of editor-in-chief Nigel Collins and several editorial staff in 2011 and a series of questionable ratings decisions by the new editors prompted many members of The Ring Ratings Advisory Panel to resign. This led to the formation of the Transnational Boxing Rankings Board in 2012 headed by boxing historians Springs Toledo, Cliff Rold and Tim Starks.

Golden Boy has publicized The Ring'''s World Championship when the title is at stake in fights it promotes (such as Joe Calzaghe vs. Roy Jones Jr. in 2008).

Current champions
Men's
As of 

Women's
As of  

Current The Ring #1 ranked fighters

Note: The Ring champions are also noted as No. 1 fighters

Men's

Women's

List of pound for pound #1 fighters

Keys:
 Current P4P #1

See also
 List of The Ring world champions
 List of The Ring pound for pound rankings
 List of fights between two The Ring pound for pound boxers
 The Ring magazine Comeback of the Year
 The Ring magazine Event of the Year
 The Ring magazine Fighter of the Year
 The Ring magazine Fight of the Year
 The Ring magazine Hall of Fame
 The Ring magazine Knockout of the Year
 The Ring magazine Pound for Pound
 The Ring magazine Progress of the Year (discontinued)
 The Ring magazine Prospect of the Year (discontinued between 1989 and 2010)
 The Ring magazine Round of the Year
 The Ring magazine Upset of the Year
 The Ring: Boxing the 20th Century''
 List of professional wrestling magazines

References

External links 
 

 
1922 establishments in the United States
Sports magazines published in the United States
Boxing magazines
Magazines established in 1922
Magazines published in Los Angeles
Magazines published in Pennsylvania
Professional wrestling magazines
Golden Boy Promotions